Calexcitin is a calcium-binding protein first isolated from the sea snail Hermissenda crassicornis. It is upregulated following Pavlovian conditioning.

Calexcitin has four EF-hand motifs that possess different functions while the fourth one is nonfunctional. Calexcitin has the tendency to regulate K+ channels. In addition, Calexcitin also shows a sign of GTP binding protein in which that binds to Ca2+.

Calexcitin is neuronal-specific and becomes phosphorylated and upregulated in learning of association.

EF-hand motifs 
Calexcitin which has four EF-hand motifs. The first three function in the binding metal ions which are from EF-1 to EF-3.  EF-1 and EF-2 contain the proclivity into binding with Mg2+ and Ca2+. However, the EF-3 has a tendency into binding with Ca2+. The fourth EF-hand does not function due to the lack of metal-binding residues.

Functions 

Calexcitin directly regulate the K+ channels. Due to the fact that "Calexcitin is also a high affinity substrate for protein kinase C. Application of calexcitin to the inner surface of inside-out patches of human fibroblast membranes, in the presence of Ca2+ and the absence of endogenous Ca2+/calmodulin kinase type II or protein kinase C activity, reduced the mean open time and mean open probability of 115 ± 6 pS K+ channels". Also, calexcitin is very great at making the membrane to be more excitable due to "When microinjected into molluscan neurons or rabbit cerebellar Purkinje cell dendrites". In addition, calexcitin acts as a Ca2+ activated signaling molecule in which it plays a role into increasing the cellular excitability. while making it more likely to increase the Ca2+ influx in the membrane. Also, this shows an example of GTP-binding protein that by which binds to Ca2+.

References

External links
                                                                                
 

Molluscan proteins